Sabal etonia, commonly known as the scrub palmetto is a species of palm. It is native only to peninsular Florida in the United States, where it is found in Florida sand pine scrub communities.

Description
Plants usually have four to seven costapalmate leaves, each with 25–50 leaflets. The inflorescences, which are branched with a bushy appearance, are shorter than the leaves and bear brownish-black fruit.

Taxonomy
Sabal is placed in the subfamily Coryphoideae and the tribe Sabaleae.

The species was first described by American botanist Walter Tennyson Swingle in 1896, based on collections made near Eustis, Florida, in 1894.

Gallery

References

etonia
Endemic flora of Florida
Plants described in 1896
Flora without expected TNC conservation status